Fernando Redondo Solari (born 15 September 1994) is an Argentine footballer who plays as a midfielder for Tigre. He is son of former football player Fernando Redondo.

References

Argentine footballers
1994 births
Living people
Club Atlético Tigre footballers
Argentine Primera División players
Association football midfielders